Arrigo Colombo (1916–1998) was an Italian film producer.

He founded Jolly Film with Giorgio Papi, which produced Duello nel Texas (1963).

Arrigo Colombo and Giorgio Papi hired Sergio Leone to direct A Fistful of Dollars (1964) with a budget of 200.000 dollars. He was the only one who accepted the project by Giuliano Montaldo Sacco e Vanzetti (1971).

Filmography

As producer

As writer

As director
 Black Magic (1949)

References

External links
 

1916 births
1998 deaths
Italian film producers